Three is an American adventure drama television series created by Evan Katz, that aired on The WB from February 2 to March 23, 1998. The series was produced by MTV Productions.

Plot
The plot of the show was centered on three thieves, who all participated in crimes that brought no legitimate suffering to others.  They were captured by a secret agency that forced them to use their abilities on the agency's behalf to combat criminals who were a threat against the American way of life, under threat of going to prison themselves.

Cast
 Edward Atterton as Johnathan Vance
 Julie Bowen as Amanda Webb
 Bumper Robinson as Marcus Miller
 David Warner as 'The Man'

Episodes

See also
 It Takes a Thief

References

External links
 

The WB original programming
1990s American drama television series
1998 American television series debuts
1998 American television series endings
Television series by CBS Studios
English-language television shows
 Television shows set in Washington, D.C.